MIMI  is a literary prize of Germany. Mimi is a female given name popular after 1962 film Ohne Krimi geht die Mimi nie ins Bett (Mimi goes never to bed without a crime book'').

References

German literary awards